Giovanni Ghiselli (15 November 1934 – 26 February 1997) was an Italian sprinter who won three gold medals in one edition of Mediterranean Games. He was born in Novara.

He was finalist with the national relay team on 4x100 metres relay at the 1956 Summer Olympics (4th place).

Biography
Ghiselli participated at one edition of the Summer Olympics (1956). He had 7 caps in national team from 1953 to 1958.

Achievements

See also
Italy national relay team

References

External links
 
 Report on Italian Olympic athletes 

1934 births
1997 deaths
People from Novara
Italian male sprinters
Olympic athletes of Italy
Athletes (track and field) at the 1956 Summer Olympics
Mediterranean Games gold medalists for Italy
Athletes (track and field) at the 1955 Mediterranean Games
Mediterranean Games medalists in athletics
Athletics competitors of Fiamme Oro
Sportspeople from the Province of Novara